Cholos pescadores ('Cholo fishermen',  cholo pescador) are a social group that live in Ecuador's Guayas and Manabí provinces. They are descended from Hispanicized indigenous coastal peoples, which were wiped out as political entities during the colonial era, but maintained a separate identity. Today, cholos pescadores continue to engage in fishing as their primary economic activity.

See also
Manteño civilization
Montubio
Caiçaras
Cholo
Ribeirinhos

Further reading

Ethnic groups in Ecuador